Amarnath Nagarajan (born 2 April 1954) is an Indian basketball player. He competed in the men's tournament at the 1980 Summer Olympics.

References

External links
 

1954 births
Living people
Basketball players from Tamil Nadu
Indian men's basketball players
Olympic basketball players of India
Basketball players at the 1980 Summer Olympics